Guljabba is a village in Swat [Swat District of Khyber Pakhtunkhwa] . It is located at 34°48'0N 72°17'30E with an altitude of 880 metres (2890 feet). Neighbouring settlements include [Hazara, in Swat] and [Kabbal].

References

Populated places in Swat District